CFSH-FM is a Christian radio station format that operates at 92.9 FM in Apsley, Ontario, Canada.

Known locally as 'CFSH Apsley 92.9 FM - The Fish' or 'CFSH FM Apsley - The Rock', this radio station serves an area of approximately 145 km2. in East Central Ontario which physiographically is best characterised as a predominantly Pre-Cambrian Granitic Canadian Shield region in the Kawartha Lakes district of the province.

Owned by the Apsley Community Chapel, the station was given approval by the Canadian Radio-television and Telecommunications Commission (CRTC) on January 17, 2008.

Undated, the station signed on the air.

References

External links
 

Fsh
Fsh
Radio stations established in 2008
2008 establishments in Ontario